Villegusien-le-Lac is a commune in the Haute-Marne department in north-eastern France. On 1 January 2016, the former commune Heuilley-Cotton was merged into Villegusien-le-Lac. It is around 50 km north of Dijon.

See also
Communes of the Haute-Marne department

References

Villegusienlelac